The Czech Republic women's national handball team is the national team of the Czech Republic. It takes part in international team handball competitions.

The team participated in the 1995 World Women's Handball Championship, and also in 1997, in 1999 and in 2003.

Results

World Championship
1995 – 13–16th
1997 – 13th
1999 – 19th
2003 – 15th
2013 – 15th
2017 – 8th
2021 – 19th

European Championship
1994 – 8th
2002 – 8th
2004 – 15th
2012 – 12th
2016 – 10th
2018 – 15th
2020 – 15th

Current squad
Squad for the 2021 World Women's Handball Championship.

Head coach: Jan Bašný

References

External links

IHF profile

National team
Handball
Women's national handball teams